From 1299, the newly founded state of the Ottoman Turks had been slowly but surely capturing territory from the Byzantine Greeks. The loss of Nicaea was the beginning of a series of Ottoman expansions that led to the final dissolution of the Byzantine Empire and its scattered Greek successor states.

Siege

Following the Byzantine defeat at Nicaea in 1331, the loss of Nicomedia was only a matter of time for the Byzantines. Andronikos III Palaiologos, the Byzantine emperor, attempted to bribe the Ottoman leader Orhan, but in 1337, Orhan laid siege to Nicomedia, Andronikos, Emperor of the Byzantines, set out on a long journey with his army to confront the Albanian rebels in 1337 AD, and there was no possibility of him coming to the Nicomedia and the city’s ruler at that time was a princess from the emperor’s dynasty, seeing this Orhan did not miss the opportunity and hurried to besiege Nicomedia, and when he arrived there, all the Muslim warriors in the vicinity joined him. The Garrison did not withstand longer due to hunger and lack of supplies, so the garrison decided to surrender, the inhabitants were allowed to leave the city for Constantinople.

Aftermath

Following the loss of Nicomedia, the situation of the Byzantine Empire remained untenable. Unlike the Byzantine Empire at 1096, the Byzantine Empire now possessed very little land, except a few cities in the Peloponnesian Peninsula. With its Serbian and Bulgarian neighbours pressing against its frontiers from the west and the Ottomans dismantling their hold on the east, the Empire was at bay. What's more, this long-held history of Nicomedia in the Greco-Roman hands since the Alexandrian Conquest, including Diocletian's first eastern court in the Roman history which is to evolve into concept of its own court in the Greek East - ultimately Constantinople - irreversibly ended. After the Ottoman conquest of Nicomedia, the Byzantine garrison was told to convert to Islam by Orhan.

See also

References

 R.G. Grant, Battle: A Visual Journey Through 5,000 Years of Combat, Dorling Kindersley Publishers Ltd, 2005. 

Conflicts in 1333
Conflicts in 1334
Conflicts in 1335
Conflicts in 1336
Conflicts in 1337
Nicomedia
Sieges involving the Byzantine Empire
Sieges involving the Ottoman Empire
1330s in the Byzantine Empire
History of Izmit
1330s in the Ottoman Empire
1333 in the Ottoman Empire
1337 in the Ottoman Empire